The Whipple shield or Whipple bumper, invented by Fred Whipple, is a type of hypervelocity impact shield used to protect crewed and uncrewed spacecraft from collisions with micrometeoroids and orbital debris whose velocities generally range between .  According to NASA, the Whipple shield is designed to withstand collisions with debris up to 1 cm, which helps to mitigate the Kessler syndrome.

Shield
In contrast to monolithic shielding of early spacecraft, Whipple shields consist of a relatively thin outer bumper spaced some distance from the main spacecraft wall. The bumper is not expected to stop the incoming particle or even remove much of its energy, but to break up and disperse it, dividing the original particle energy among many fragments that fan out between bumper and wall. The original particle energy is spread more thinly over a larger wall area, which is more likely to withstand it. A direct analogy is that a lighter bullet resistant vest is needed to stop a load of birdshot than a single rifle bullet with the same total mass and kinetic energy. Although a Whipple shield lowers total spacecraft mass compared to a solid shield (always desirable in spaceflight), the extra enclosed volume may require a larger payload fairing.

There are several variations on the simple Whipple shield. Multi-shock shields, like the one used on the Stardust spacecraft, use multiple bumpers spaced apart to increase the shield's ability to protect the spacecraft. Whipple shields that have a filling in between the rigid layers of the shield are called stuffed Whipple shields. The filling in these shields is usually a high-strength material like Kevlar or Nextel aluminium oxide fiber. The type of shield, the material, thickness and distance between layers are varied to produce a shield with minimal mass that will also minimize the probability of penetration. There are over 100 shield configurations on the International Space Station alone, with higher-risk areas having better shielding.

See also 
 Micrometeoroid shielding
 Spaced armor
 Double hull

References

External links 
Brief descriptions of spacecraft shielding by NASA
B.G. Cour-Palais' reminisces of the Apollo meteoroid protection program
The Skylab meteoroid shield design and development
ESA Giotto dust shield
J.L. Crews' recounting of the invention of the multi-shock shield, pp. 21–29
Installing the Nextel/Kevlar blankets in the Destiny laboratory stuffed Whipple Shields
Meteoroid/Debris Protection System Development at ESA for ATV and Columbus
Hyper-velocity impact test at JAXA of Kibo's debris shield

Spacecraft components
Shields